Nioki is a town and community in Mai-Ndombe province of the Democratic Republic of the Congo, on the Fimi River.
It was founded as a colonial post by Alexandre Delcommune around 1887.

References

Populated places in Mai-Ndombe Province
1887 establishments